Cicero Stephens Hawks (May 26, 1812 – April 19, 1868) was the first Episcopal bishop of Missouri.

Biography
Hawks was born in New Bern, North Carolina.  After an education at the University of North Carolina, Hawks began to study the law, but abandoned it in favor of a clerical occupation.  He was ordained deacon on December 8, 1834, and priest on July 24, 1836.  His first parishes were in Saugerties and Buffalo, New York.  His brothers, Francis Lister Hawks and William Nassau Hawks, were also Episcopal priests.  Hawks married Ann Jones in 1835.

He became rector of Christ Church, St. Louis, Missouri in 1844, in what was then the Diocese of Missouri and Indiana.  After the diocese was divided, Hawks became the bishop of Missouri.  He was the 44th bishop in the ECUSA, and was consecrated on October 20, 1844, by Bishops Philander Chase, Jackson Kemper, and Samuel Allen McCoskry.  He received a D.D. from the University of Missouri in 1847.  During his service as bishop, he continued to be the rector of Christ Church, serving in both positions until 1854, when he relinquished the rectorship.  During a cholera epidemic in 1849, Hawks ministered to the sick of the city.  He became ill in 1867, and asked Bishop Thomas H. Vail of Kansas to assist in his parish visitations.  Hawks died the following year, on April 19, 1868, and was buried at Bellefontaine Cemetery in St. Louis.

Sources

References

 ^ Windham, Lane (2018-01-18). "9to5". University of North Carolina Press. doi:10.5149/North carolina/9781469632070.003.0008.

University of North Carolina at Chapel Hill alumni
People from New Bern, North Carolina
Episcopal bishops of Missouri
1812 births
1868 deaths
19th-century American Episcopalians
19th-century American clergy